Mallory Haldeman is an American IFBB professional figure and fitness competitor. She is also a fitness model, personal trainer and health and wellness coach.

She achieved status as a professional figure competitor with the IFBB in 2012 after winning the 2012 National Physique Committee Junior National Championships by winning 1st place in her Figure Class and being named overall winner of the Figure Competition.

Her highest achievements to date have been winning the 2013 IFBB Tahoe Pro Figure, 2013 IFBB PBW Tampa Pro Figure, 2012 NPC Junior National Championships and two top five finishes in the 2012 and 2013 Figure Olympia events.  She also won the 2012 Rookie of the year honor given annually by Flex.

Haldeman is trained by IFBB professional Tracey Greenwood.

Competitive philosophy

Haldeman stated in an article posted on Muscle Foods USA's website: "I found fitness more by circumstance than anything else. I had an injury (2009) that resulted in my inability to walk or run for quite some time. It was recommended to me that I try weight training during this time to keep in shape and help reduces my recovery time. At the time I had zero interest in lifting weights or making a daily trip to the gym. It didn’t take long, however, until I found that I loved what resistance training can do to your body. After only a few short weeks I was hooked and started to learn everything I could about sculpting and building my physique….and although a few years have passed since then I am just as excited learning about everything health and fitness related ! It is a life style that I have completely submerged myself in!"

Competitions

She has participated in the following shows:

2014 IFBB California Governors Cup Pro - 6th
2013 Olympia Figure - 5th
2013 IFBB Tahoe Pro Figure - 1st
2013 IFBB PBW Tampa Pro Figure - 1st
2013 IFBB California Governors Cup Pro - 3rd
2013 Australia Pro Figure - 4th
2013 Arnold Figure International - 5th
2012 IFBB Olympia - 5th
2012 IFBB Tournament of Champions Pro Figure - 2nd
2012 IFBB PBW Tampa Pro - 2nd
2012 NPC Junior National Championships - 1st and Overall
2012 NPC Junior USA Championships - 3rd
2011 NPC USA Championships - 3rd
2011 NPC Team Universe & National Fitness Championships - 16th
2011 NPC Junior USA Championships - 4th
2011 NPC Pittsburgh Championships - 5th
2011 NPC NY Metropolitan - 2nd

See also 
 List of female fitness & figure competitors

References

Media Coverage
 Mallory Haldeman wins 2012 US Junior Nationals
 The Great Athlete that is Mallory Haldeman
 Real Talk - Real Women Interview of Mallory Haldeman
 Hardbody Training - Legs like Mallory Haldeman
 VBINews interview of Mallory Haldeman
 FemaleMuscle article - What Abs in Vegas
 Muscle & Fitness Hers
 Interview at the 2013 Arnold Expo
 Flex Magazine One on one Spotlight
 NPC Online coverage
 Bodybuilder Profile
 Figure Olympia Predictions
 2014 Governors Cup

External links
 Official Website
 Mallory Haldeman Twitter Account
 Mallory Haldeman Facebook Account

1986 births
American female bodybuilders
Living people
Fitness and figure competitors
Sportspeople from Lancaster, Pennsylvania
21st-century American women